Green Township is a township in Livingston County, in the U.S. state of Missouri.

Green Township most likely was named after Nathanael Greene (1742–1786), American Revolutionary War general.

References

Townships in Missouri
Townships in Livingston County, Missouri